Thomas Blennerhassett (fl. 1584–1611) was an English politician who sat in the House of Commons  at various times between 1584 and 1611.

Blennerhassett may have been the son of Richard Blennerhassett, a member of the Carlisle Council in 1569.  In 1584, Blennerhassett was elected Member of Parliament for Carlisle. He was re-elected MP for Carlisle in 1586. In 1597 he was Mayor of Carlisle. He was elected MP for Carlisle again in 1604.

References

Year of birth missing
Year of death missing
People from Carlisle, Cumbria
Place of birth missing
Mayors of Carlisle, Cumbria
English MPs 1584–1585
English MPs 1586–1587
English MPs 1604–1611
Thomas